Kristo Robo (born 7 December 1948) is an Albanian shooter who competed at the 1992 Summer Olympic Games in the 25 metre rapid fire pistol, he finished 30th, he was also the Albanian flag bearer.

References

Shooters at the 1992 Summer Olympics
Olympic shooters of Albania
Living people
1948 births
Albanian male sport shooters